George Philip Nicholas Windsor, Earl of St Andrews (born 26 June 1962) is an English philanthropist, former diplomat and a member of the British royal family. He was a member of HM Diplomatic Service in New York and Budapest. St Andrews became chancellor of the University of Bolton in 2017. He is the trustee of the Next Century and Global eHealth foundations and patron of the Welsh Sinfonia. He is the elder son of Prince Edward, Duke of Kent, and Katharine, Duchess of Kent, and heir-apparent to the Dukedom of Kent. He is currently 41st in the line of succession to the British throne.

Early life and career 

Lord St Andrews is the son of Prince Edward, Duke of Kent, and Katharine, Duchess of Kent, and was educated at Eton College and Downing College, Cambridge, where he earned an MA degree in History.

St Andrews served in the Diplomatic Service in New York and Budapest. He later worked in the antiquarian book business for the Christie's auction house. Lord St Andrews was a trustee of the SOS Children's Villages UK charity and is a patron of the Association for International Cancer Research. He was also a patron of Clifton Scientific Trust, an educational charity giving young people experience of the world of science and engineering. In April 2012, he also became a trustee of the Next Century Foundation, a charity working throughout the Middle East. Furthermore, he is a trustee of the Global eHealth Foundation and Patron of the Welsh Sinfonia. On 30 March 2017, he was installed as chancellor of the University of Bolton.

Personal life 
On 9 January 1988, George Windsor married Sylvana Tomaselli, a Canadian-born academic, at Leith Registrar Office near Edinburgh. The couple have three children:
Edward Windsor, Lord Downpatrick
Lady Marina Windsor 
Lady Amelia Windsor

References

1962 births
Living people
Alumni of Downing College, Cambridge
Members of HM Diplomatic Service
Courtesy earls
George Windsor, Earl of St Andrews
People educated at Eton College
People educated at Heatherdown School
21st-century philanthropists
English patrons of music
People associated with the University of Bolton
English philanthropists
Children of peers and peeresses